Power Soccer, also known as Power Challenge and PS, was a massively multiplayer online browser-based sports game, developed by the Swedish developer Power Challenge, the same company that develops ManagerZone (but PS focuses in the sports gameplay instead of management simulation). This game was a browser-based soccer simulator in which users could create a team and play against other users from all around the globe. Additional benefits were offered to those that purchased the Club Membership.

Following a decline in interest from users in the game, it was announced that on May 16, 2016 Power Soccer would come to an end, encouraging users to join their sister game ManagerZone. The announcement was made months before the closure date, which led to many posts in the forums where some users even wanted to donate to keep the game afloat but to no avail, and in the early hours of May 16, 2016, the game closed.

Gameplay

Power Soccer let users create their own team and play against people from all around the world. Starting with a soccer team, their mission was to level up, improve and fight between the game's best players. Users had the option to customize their players, use any tactic, change their team colours and uniform, plus playing with any playing style.

In order to buy digital goods such as tattoos, personal coaches and more, users had to use Tickets or Power Tokens.

Game Modes

Tournaments 
Tournaments were competitions that usually lasted a couple of days. They offered the chance to join a competition that started right away. Users could make their way through several level spans, and they could join a new one if they were eliminated.

Quick games 
Quick Games were 1 on 1 multiplayer games where users competed for rank points. This game mode was available for all users that were above level 5. Their opponents would be mostly people that were close to their location, and that had a similar level & ranking.

Clans 
Groups of players, known as clans, competed in clan cups, which were of different sizes. Both normal members and Club Members could join clans for free, but only Club Members could create them by paying 1000 Tickets. If their clan reached a good ranking position, users would be able to compete on the Clan League, which allowed them to compete against the best clans of the game.

Cups 
This game mode allowed users to play cups, which could be played with a different number of players, and the more players it had, the more matches it would bring. The winner was the user that got the highest number of points. Users would always face opponents that were near their position in the cup.

There were two kinds of cups:

Basic Cups: Everyone could join if they fit the requirements, and they would compete as an individual. The first place would receive a trophy, while sometimes the second place and even third place would receive a trophy, depending on the number of players of each cup.
Clan cups: Users competed representing their clan, and earned points in order to help it. The cup owner would decide how many players competed for each clan, which means it could be 1vs1, 2vs2 and more. The clan that got the highest number of points would receive a clan trophy, and the user that reached the highest number of points would receive a "Most Valuable Player" medal (also known as MVP).

Practice 
This was a free-for-all mode, that let users train their skills in an Open Field or against the CPU teams.
There were three modes to practice:
Tutorial: Small tutorial that let users learn the basics of the game.
Open Field: This is a mode that let users finetune their technique on an open field, free of opponents.
Training match: This let users play against the CPU controlled teams. Users could choose between playing against the Easy Team, Medium Team and Hard Team.

Club Membership 
Being a Club Member allowed users to access the whole game, including all its game modes. They could do things like setting attitudes, nicknames and names for their players, receive exclusive tactics, play exclusive tournaments, receive an exclusive home stadium, level up faster, create cups, create clans, create their own team badge, access the Team Progress Analyzer, get exclusive uniforms, store & display additional highlights, and more. The Club Membership could be acquired via cash, and only monthly.

Store 

The game had a store that let users buy many digital goods that could satisfy them. Regular users got access to style items like hairstyles, facial hair, dribbles, celebrations and being able to change their player's skin colour. In order to get full unlimited access to shoes, coaches and other skill enhancing goods that could boost their team's skills, users had to buy the Skill Package. They could buy it by paying cash, or 10000 Tickets. 
If they bought it, they could access all the skill boosting items for free.
Depending on their package's length, their items would be taken away when their package expires, but they still could renew it whenever they wanted.

Virtual Currency 
Tickets were the virtual currency in Power Soccer. Users got them through various achievements such as leveling up, winning cups, advancing in tournaments, inviting friends, and more. Club Members had the best chance of racking up Tickets, but non-members still had a limited opportunity to do so.

Power Tokens used to be the official currency of the game, representing real money. As of August 13, 2015, it was no longer possible to purchase Power Tokens, but users who owned Power Tokens could still spend them through the player shop, or by adding extra Club Membership or Skill Package time to their accounts.

Community 
The game had a big community with people from all around the world, as it was available in 18 languages. Players could communicate using the forums, private chats, public chatrooms and through their guestbooks.

Administrators 
The game had a big list of admins that focused in different aspects. The admin roles were the following:

Master Assistant (MA):  Responsible to design admins and supervise all the other admins, as well as monitor the community.
Chat Admin (CA):  Responsible for moderating the chatrooms.
Forum Admin (FA):  Responsible for moderating the forums.
Language Assistant (LA): They had to translate the site content (forums, news, etc.) from English to their language.
Reporter Assistant (RA): They released articles and news related to the game, and they published it in their corresponding site (English or Spanish).

Additionally, the "Crew" term was adhered to the people that worked for the game.

External links 
 Power Soccer's official site

2005 video games
Browser-based multiplayer online games
Association football video games
Video games developed in Sweden
Inactive massively multiplayer online games